Lewis House may refer to:

In Australia
 Lewis House, Cottesloe, a State Register of Heritage Place in Cottesloe, Western Australia

In England
 C. S. Lewis House, in Oxford, known as The Kilns

In the United States (ordered by state and then city)
Jay Lewis House, McGehee, Arkansas, listed on the National Register of Historic Places (NRHP) in Desha County
Lewis House (Lafayette, Colorado), listed on the NRHP in Boulder County
Isaac C. Lewis Cottage, Branford, Connecticut, listed on the NRHP in New Haven County
Isaac Lewis House (Stratford, Connecticut), listed on the NRHP in Fairfield County
Lewis-Zukowski House, Suffield, Connecticut, listed on the NRHP in Hartford County
Jefferson Lewis House, Kenton, Delaware, listed on the NRHP in Kent County
Edward Simon Lewis House, listed on the NRHP in Southwest Washington, D.C.
Greene-Lewis House, Tallahassee, Florida, listed on the NRHP in Leon County
Lewis House (Tallahassee, Florida), Tallahassee, Florida, listed on the NRHP in Leon County
J. A. Lewis House, Clarkesville, Georgia, listed on the NRHP in Habersham County
DeVaughn-Lewis House, Montezuma, Georgia, listed on the NRHP in Macon County
Lewis Bungalow, Paris, Idaho, listed on the NRHP in Bear Lake County
Fred Lewis Cottage, Paris, Idaho, listed on the NRHP in Bear Lake County
Lloyd Lewis House, Libertyville, Illinois, listed on the NRHP in Lake County
John W. Lewis House, Marshall, Illinois, listed on the NRHP in Clark County
John L. Lewis House, Springfield, Illinois, listed on the NRHP in Sangamon County
Thomas J. Lewis House, Roann, Indiana, listed on the NRHP in Wabash County
Woodson Lewis House, Greensburg, Kentucky, listed on the NRHP in Green County
Dr. John Lewis House, St. Matthews, Kentucky, listed on the NRHP in Jefferson County
Alpheus Lewis House (also known as the Oakwood Estate), Winchester, Kentucky, listed on the NRHP in Clark County
Lewis Manor, Lexington, Kentucky, listed on the NRHP in Fayette County
Booker-Lewis House, Leesville, Louisiana, listed on the NRHP in Vernon Parish
John Lewis House (Opelousas, Louisiana), listed on the NRHP in St. Landry Parish
Lewis House (Ruston, Louisiana), listed on the NRHP in Lincoln Parish
Lewis House (Shreveport, Louisiana), listed on the NRHP in Caddo Parish
Lewis House (Reading, Massachusetts), listed on the NRHP in Middlesex County
Charles D. Lewis House, Sherborn, Massachusetts, listed on the NRHP in Middlesex County
Deacon Willard Lewis House, Walpole, Massachusetts, listed on the NRHP in Norfolk County
F.W. Lewis House, Midland, Michigan, listed on the NRHP in Midland County
E. H. Lewis House, Chaska, Minnesota, listed on the NRHP in Carver County
Lewis House and Medical Office, Henning, Minnesota, listed on the NRHP in Otter Tail County
Sinclair Lewis Boyhood Home, Sauk Centre, Minnesota, listed on the NRHP in Stearns County
Ervin Lewis House, Byram, Mississippi, listed on the NRHP in Hinds County
A.J. Lewis House, Edwards, Mississippi, listed on the NRHP in Hinds County
Colonel Alfred E. Lewis House, Gautier, Mississippi, listed on the NRHP in Jackson County
Iva Lewis House, Grandin, Missouri, listed on the NRHP in Carter County
Lewis-Webb House, Independence, Missouri, listed on the NRHP in Jackson County
Lewis-Nevala Homestead, Belt, Montana, listed on the NRHP in Cascade County
Samuel Lewis House (Bozeman, Montana), listed on the NRHP in Gallatin County
Lewis House (Lewistown, Montana), listed on the NRHP in Fergus County
Lewis-Syford House, Lincoln, Nebraska, listed on the NRHP in Lancaster County
Harry and Molly Lewis House, Beaver Falls, New York, listed on the NRHP in Lewis County
Palmer-Lewis Estate, Bedford, New York, listed on the NRHP in Westchester County
Lewis House (Cape Vincent, New York), listed on the NRHP in Jefferson County
Lewis-Thornburg Farm, Asheboro, North Carolina, listed on the NRHP in Randolph County
Lewis-Smith House, Raleigh, North Carolina, listed on the NRHP in Wake County
Lewis House (Fargo, North Dakota), a Classical Revival house listed on the NRHP in Cass County
Samuel Lewis House (Mansfield, Ohio), listed on the NRHP in Richland County
Samuel Lewis Farmhouse, Radnor, Ohio, listed on the NRHP in Delaware County
Dr. A.C. Lewis House, Winchester, Ohio, listed on the NRHP in Adams County
Lewis-Shippy House, Dayton, Oregon, listed on the NRHP in Yamhill County
William H. Lewis Model House, Portland, Oregon, listed on the NRHP in Multnomah County
Evan Lewis House, Exton, Pennsylvania, listed on the NRHP in Chester County
Lewis-Card-Perry House, Westerly, Rhode Island, listed on the NRHP in Washington County
William Lewis House (Waxahachie, Texas), listed on the NRHP in Ellis County
John S. and Izola Lewis House, Orem, Utah, listed on the NRHP in Utah County
Dr. David and Juanita Lewis House, Salt Lake City, Utah, listed on the NRHP in Salt Lake County
Lewis Farm, listed on the NRHP in Charlottesville, Virginia
Shumaker-Lewis House, Mason, West Virginia, listed on the NRHP in Mason County
Lewis-Capehart-Roseberry House, Point Pleasant, West Virginia, listed on the NRHP in Mason County
Lewis Farmhouse, Boardman, Wisconsin, listed on the NRHP in St. Croix County
Gov. James T. Lewis House, Columbus, Wisconsin, listed on the NRHP in Columbia County
Lewis-Williams House, Hudson, Wisconsin, listed on the NRHP in St. Croix County
Morey-Lewis House, Waukesha, Wisconsin, listed on the NRHP in Waukesha County